In Canada, licence plate numbers are usually assigned in ascending order, beginning with a starting point such as AAA-001.

As such, someone familiar with the sequence can determine roughly when the licence plate was issued. After Ontario's transition to an ABCD-123 format in 1997, plates were issued in ascending order starting with AAAA-001. It took close to 10 years to exhaust the supply of plate numbers with A as the first digit.  In late 2006, plates with B as the first digit were assigned, and have continued from there sequentially. Plates with C as the first digit are now commonplace as of 2021.

The gradual increase in the use of letters in the serials of licence plates has given rise to an increased possibility of unintentional profane or inappropriate words or messages arising from the use of sequential alphanumeric combinations. Thus, numbering sequences generally exclude certain combinations of letters or numbers that would be potentially offensive. Jurisdictions' attention to excluding offensive combinations varies widely, however. In 1986, Waldale, a Canadian licence plate manufacturer, due to a production error, produced an entire batch of New Brunswick plates that began with the letters ASS. The plates were issued, and were unofficially scrapped, but many found their way into the collectors' black market.

From 1971 to 1975, Manitoba's licence plate bore the slogan "Sunny Manitoba: 100,000 lakes," but was changed to "Friendly Manitoba," possibly due to conflict with Minnesota's "10,000 lakes" slogan.

Current designs and serial formats

The most recent design or serial format being issued.

Passenger plates

Note: For Ontario and Quebec electric vehicle plates, letters in bold denotes that they are specifically set to identify them, apart from the regular issuance.

Commercial plates
Most provinces issue separate commercial plates for trucks, usually for commercial purposes or over a certain vehicle weight.

Former designs and serial formats still valid 

Designs or serial formats that are no longer issued, yet are still valid for use.

See also
 U.S. license plate designs and serial formats

References

External links
 Automobile License Plate Collectors' Association
 Current High-Issue License Plates (U.S. and Canada)
  License Plates of North America, 1969-Present
 The Back Bumper

Designs